The Carbonera Formation is a geologic formation in Mexico. It preserves fossils dating back to the Berriasian to Hauterivian stages of the Early Cretaceous period.

Fossil content 
The following fossils were reported from the formation:
Ammonites
 Maderia casitensis
 Mexicanoceras laticostatum
 M. multicostatum
 ?Hemihoplites mexicanus
 cf. Phylloceras serum
 Distoloceras sp.
Bivalves
 Exogyra reedi
 Plicatula pulchra
 Gryphaea sp.
Gastropods
 Vermetus cornejoi
 Pleurotomaria sp.
Brachiopods
 Ptilorhynchia (Proteorhynchia) durangensis
Corals
 Paretallonia hispaniensis

See also 
 List of fossiliferous stratigraphic units in Mexico

References

Bibliography 
 M. R. Sandy. 1990. Early Cretaceous brachiopods from Mexico and their paleobiogeographic significance. Journal of Paleontology 64(6):942-956
 R. W. Imlay. 1940. Neocomian Faunas of Northern Mexico. Geological Society America Bulletin 51(1):117-190

Geologic formations of Mexico
Lower Cretaceous Series of North America
Cretaceous Mexico
Berriasian Stage
Hauterivian Stage
Valanginian Stage
Sandstone formations
Shale formations
Shallow marine deposits
Paleontology in Mexico